Coiled-coil domain-containing protein 85B is a protein that in humans is encoded by the CCDC85B gene.

Function 

Hepatitis delta virus (HDV) is a pathogenic human virus whose RNA genome and replication cycle resemble those of plant viroids. Delta-interacting protein A (DIPA), a cellular gene product, has been found to have homology to hepatitis delta virus antigen (HDAg). DIPA interacts with the viral antigen, HDAg, and can affect HDV replication in vitro.

Interactions 

CCDC85B has been shown to interact with:
 C19orf25,
 KIAA1267, 
 Keratin 17, and
 Protein kinase N1.

References

External links

Further reading